The Turn of the Lights is the third and final solo album of Brazilian vocalist/pianist Andre Matos.

Track listing

Charts

Personnel
Andre Matos - Vocals, piano and keyboards.
Andre Hernandes - Guitars
Hugo Mariutti - Guitars
Bruno Ladislau - Bass guitar
Rodrigo Silveira - Drums

References 

2012 albums
Andre Matos albums